Brighlingsea Naval Base  was an installation of the British Royal Navy located at Brightlingsea, Essex, on the East Coast of England. It was a sub-area command under the Commander-in-Chief, The Nore from 1914 to 1921 and again from 1939 to 1945.

Brightlingsea is a coastal town in the Tendring district of Essex, England. It is situated between Colchester and Clacton-on-Sea, at the mouth of the River Colne, on Brightlingsea Creek.

History

In World War I Brightlingsea naval base was in charge of the protective anti-torpedo net barrier around the Swin Anchorage, used at various times by the 3rd Battle Squadron, the Dover Patrol, and other naval units. It installed, maintained and finally dismantled the booms and nets, patrolled around them, and also patrolled the local Essex river estuaries and coastline, using trawlers, drifters, Motor Launches (MLs) and Coastal Motor Boats. After mid-1916 it was also the base for the steam gunboat . The local shipyards also maintained its craft and some of those from the Dover Patrol. Rear-Admiral C L Napier was in command from late 1914 till Spring 1916, then Commander R Hartland Mahan replaced him. Including the old light cruiser  which was attached in 1915–1916, manpower varied from about 300 to 500. The shore base was initially named HMS Wallaroo (after the ship), then City of Perth (after a net drifter). 

Unconnected with the Navy was the Army School of Military (Field) Engineering, and from Summer 1916 the Australian Engineer Training Depot (AETD), with a combined strength of up to 1400 personnel.

That June, after their departure, the Navy set up the shore base HMS Nemo, for Essex coast auxiliary patrol. In the autumn minesweeping drifters and training landing craft were attached, together with naval air-sea rescue craft, and personnel for operating and guarding estuary observation minefields. Manpower ashore and afloat varied from about 200 to 600. A separate Coastal Forces equipping unit was also attached (from 1941), which used the local shipyards to equip and test-run many hundreds of MLs, MTBs and MGBs. The same shipyards also serviced and repaired many such craft from other bases, besides building 16 in the case of Aldous's yard. In 1942 landing craft training was separated out under HMS Helder, which moored its craft (up to 90) in the Creek but had its shore HQ opposite at St Osyth.

Senior naval officer 
The station was administered initially by the Rear-Admiral, Brightlinsea and later by the Senior Naval Officer, Brighlingsea

Rear-Admiral, Brightlingsea
Included:

Naval Officer-in-Charge, Brightlingsea
:Incomplete list of post holder included:

References

Sources
 Houterman, J.N. "Royal Navy Nore Command 1939-1945: Brighlingsea". unithistories.com. Houterman and Koppes.
 Navy lists, Quarterly. London: H.M. Stationery Office. October 1915. 
 The Navy List. London, England: H. M. Stationery Office. October 1919.
 The Navy List. London, England: H. M. Stationery Office. January 1920.
 The Navy List. London, England: H. M. Stationery Office. October 1944.
 Reebeck, Amanda. "The Anzacs of Brightlingsea: The Australian War Memorial". awm.gov.au. Australian War Memorial. 
 Shipbuilding & shipping record: (1919), a journal of shipbuilding, marine engineering, dock, harbours & shipping (Volume 14). 
 Watson, (2015), Dr Graham. "British Admiralty, Shore Establishments, Fleets and Station, World War 1". naval-history.net. Gordon Smith.
J P Foynes "Brightlingsea & the Great War" and "Under the White Ensign", based mainly on National Archive Admiralty files, and interviews.
J P Foynes "The Australians at Brightlingsea 1916-1919", based mainly on Australian Engineer War Diaries and Personnel Files at Australian National Archives and Australian War Museum, plus photo-collections and famuly research.

Royal Navy bases
Brightlingsea